The 2007–08 Football League Championship (known as the Coca-Cola Championship for sponsorship reasons) was the sixteenth season under its current league division format and its fourth with its current sponsorship. The leagues started in August 2007 and concluded in May 2008, with the promotion play-off finals.

The Football League is contested through three Divisions. The top divisions of these is the League Championship. The winner and the runner up of the League Championship will be automatically promoted to the Premiership and they will be joined by the winner of the League Championship play-off. The bottom three teams in the Championship will be relegated to the second division, League One.

West Bromwich Albion finished top of the league with 81 points, closely followed by Stoke City who had 79 points. Hull City were promoted through the play-offs. Colchester and Scunthorpe United were both relegated several weeks before the end of the season. However, in a very tight league, with a gap of only 29 points between top and 22nd place, the final team to be relegated, Leicester City, went down on the final day while six other teams were within three points of them, despite the fact that only Crystal Palace had conceded less goals.

Changes from last season

From Championship
Promoted to Premier League
 Derby County
 Birmingham City
 Sunderland

Relegated to League One
 Leeds United
 Luton Town
 Southend United

To Championship
Relegated from Premier League
 Charlton Athletic
 Sheffield United
 Watford

Promoted from League One
 Blackpool
 Bristol City
 Scunthorpe United

League table

Play-offs
The Football League Championship Playoffs took place at the end of May 2008. They involved the teams that finished third to sixth in the table. Hull (3rd) and Bristol City (4th) qualified from their semi-finals against Watford (6th) and Crystal Palace (5th) respectively over two legs. Hull City won the final with a single Dean Windass goal to win promotion to the Premier League.

Results

Top scorers

Team of the Year

Stadia

Managerial changes

Notes

 
EFL Championship seasons
1
2
Eng